This is a list of airlines currently operating in Ivory Coast.

See also

 List of airlines
 Airtransivoire

References

Ivory Coast

Airlines
Airlines
Ivory Coast